This is a list of commercial video games with later released available source code. The source code of these commercially developed and distributed video games is available to the public or the games' communities.

Background 
Commercial video games are typically developed as proprietary closed source software products, with the source code treated as a trade secret (unlike open-source video games). When there is no more expected revenue, these games enter the end-of-life as a product with no support or availability for the game's users and community, becoming abandoned.

In several of the cases listed here, the game's developers released the source code expressly to prevent their work from becoming abandonware. Such source code is often released under varying (free and non-free, commercial and non-commercial) software licenses to the games' communities or the public; artwork and data are often released under a different license than the source code, as the copyright situation is different or more complicated. The source code may be pushed by the developers to public repositories (e.g. SourceForge or GitHub), or given to selected game community members, or sold with the game, or become available by other means.
Source code availability in whatever form allows the games' communities to study how the game works, make modifications, and provide technical support themselves when the official support has ended, e.g. with unofficial patches to fix bugs or source ports to make the game compatible with new platforms.

Some developers that have released their source code have concluded that, in general terms, such action has not been harmful and even beneficial, among them Alec Holowka (Aquaria), Adam Saltsman (Canabalt), John Carmack (Wolfenstein 3D, Doom, Quake), Brian Hook (Quake II), and Terry Cavanagh (VVVVVV). Wolfire Games also noted (along with Saltsman) that releasing the source code didn't reduce sales. However, releasing the source code may and has led to clones using the original proprietary assets from the game, with two notable examples of games having clones thanks to the source release being Canabalt and Lugaru HD. Although Saltsman has noted that those clones can be removed from storefronts with a DMCA takedown notice, Jeff Rosen, co-founder of Wolfire Games, has recognized that such practices may discourage game developers from releasing their code.

Lists

Open engine and game data 
The games in this table were released under a free and open-source license with free content which allows reuse, modification and commercial redistribution of the whole game. Licenses can be public domain, GPL, BSD, Creative Commons, zlib, MIT, Artistic License or other (see the comparison of Free and open-source software and the Comparison of free and open-source software licenses).

Open-source games with free of charge data 
Only the game engines in this table are developed under an open-source license, which means that the reuse and modification of only the code is permitted. The assets are provided free of charge to the final user, but with some restrictions. Note that both the engine and the game code must be available under a license approved by the OSI and/or the FSF, if it was made with a licensed engine.

Open-source games 
Only the game engines in this table are developed under an open-source license, which means that the reuse and modification of only the code is permitted. The assets are not provided for free and must be bought by the final user. Note that both the engine and the game code must be available under a license approved by the OSI and/or the FSF, if it was made with a licensed engine.

Source-available games with free of charge data 
Video games in this table are source-available, but are neither open-source software according to the OSI definition nor free software according to the Free Software Foundation. If the source code is given out without specified license or public domain waiver it has legally to be considered as still proprietary due to the Berne Convention. The assets are provided free of charge to the final user, but with some restrictions.

Source-available games 
Video games in this table are source-available, but are neither open-source software according to the OSI definition nor free software according to the Free Software Foundation. If the source code is given out without specified license or public domain waiver it has legally to be considered as still proprietary due to the Berne Convention. The assets are not provided for free.

See also

 :Category:Commercial video games with freely available source code.
 List of open-source game engines
 List of commercial video games with available source code
 List of open-source video games
 List of formerly proprietary software
 List of commercial video games released as freeware
 List of freeware games
 List of proprietary source-available software
 Source port
 Source-available software

References

External links

 Game Source Code Collection at the Internet Archive
 Liberated Games, specialized on open sourced computer games (archived; from 2015-07-26)
 Open Source Game Clones, specialized in open source variants of commercial games

Video game lists by license
 
Video games